Sir John Babington (died 22 August 1485) of Dethick Manor was High Sheriff of Nottinghamshire, Derbyshire and the Royal Forests from 1479-1480.

He was the son of Thomas Babington of Dethick (son of Sir John Babington and Benedicta Ward) and Isabel Dethick.  He belonged to the Babington family.

In 1448 he married Isabel Bradbourne, the daughter of Henry Bradbourne and Margery Bagot. This marriage produced the following children
Sir Thomas Babington (d. 13 March 1518)
Beatrice Babington, married Ralph Pole
Anne Babington, married James Rolleston
Elizabeth Babington, married Ralph Frauncis
Margaret Babington, married Edmund Pilkington
Isabell Babington, married John Rosell
Cecily Babington, married Thomas Samon.

He was appointed High Sheriff of Nottinghamshire, Derbyshire and the Royal Forests in 1479.

He had fought for Edward IV in April 1471 at the Battle of Barnet. He was killed on 22 August 1485 by Sir John Blount fighting for Richard III at the Battle of Bosworth Field on 22 August 1485. He is mentioned in the Ballad of Bosworth Field as one of the nobles supporting Richard III in the 294th line of the ballad within the 74th stanza.

References

High Sheriffs of Nottinghamshire
High Sheriffs of Derbyshire
1485 deaths
People of the Wars of the Roses
John